Stanisław Chiliński (born 31 July 1956 in Stronie Śląskie) is a Polish former wrestler who competed in the 1980 Summer Olympics.

References

1956 births
Living people
Olympic wrestlers of Poland
Wrestlers at the 1980 Summer Olympics
Polish male sport wrestlers
People from Kłodzko County
Sportspeople from Lower Silesian Voivodeship